Halkevleri (Turkish: Halkevi literally meaning "people's houses", also translatable as "community centres") is the name of a Turkish community enlightenment  project. They were founded in 1932 and entirely abolished in 1951.

Background
The Turkish Republic was proclaimed in 1923 after a series of costly wars involving the Ottoman Empire. The human loss was great, especially among the intellectuals. Also, the most profitable agricultural land had been lost, and the country was economically bankrupt. After the republic was proclaimed, measures were taken to raise the low literacy rate and to improve the economy.  However, the great depression was another blow to the new republic. A second problem of the new republic was the reaction of the conservatives against the reforms, especially the secularist practices of the republic. The Halkevleri can be seen as the successors of the Turkish Hearths, a Turkish social institution that was disestablished before the founding of the Halkevleri in 1932.

The scope of the project
Halkevleri was an enlightenment project aimed towards city dwellers to gain support for reforms. It was planned by Kemal Atatürk, the founder of modern Turkey.

On February 17, 1932, branches of Halkevleri were opened in 17 cities. (Adana, Ankara, Bolu, Bursa, Çanakkale, Denizli, Diyarbakır, Eskişehir, İstanbul, İzmir, Konya, Malatya and Samsun.) But soon, the number increased to 478. Towards 1940, the villages were also included in the project. The sub branches in villages were called Halkodaları Towards 1950, the total number of these subsections exceeded 4000.

The activities
The purpose of the project was to enlighten the people and to decrease the influence of the conservative circles. Free courses were offered on the topics of literature, drama, music, fine arts, speaking, and writing as well as handicrafts and tailoring. Folk say and folksongs were surveyed. Halkevleri also had 761 libraries and reading rooms.

Halkevleri operated as a state organization from 1932 till 1951. During the multiparty period (after 1945), Halkevleri were severely criticized on the ground that this project was a supporter of the governing Republican People's Party.  The opposing Democrat Party won the 1950 elections. On 8 August 1951 Halkevleri were closed.

Publications
Halkevleri published nearly seventy-five periodicals, including Ülkü which was published from February 1933 and August 1950.

See also
Urfa Halkevi

References

1932 establishments in Turkey
1951 disestablishments in Turkey
Politics of Turkey
Education in Turkey
Educational institutions established in 1932
Educational institutions disestablished in 1951
Kemalism